Vinod Kulkarni (Vinōda Kulakarṇī) is an Indian actor, director, voicing artiste and voice co-ordinator, who specialises in dubbing International productions into the Hindi language. He can speak English, Hindi and Marathi. He has voiced over 20,000 commercials.

Career
He is an actor of Hindi and Marathi stage, films and serials, as well.

Filmography

Live action films

Animated series

Animated films

Dubbing career
Vinod Kulkarni started his career in 1986, when he dubbed for International productions such as Popeye. At the time, there were few contenders for such work and recognition came far easier. "We were all stars then," he recalls. "But unlike me, others would feel awkward when asked to audition for voices or imitate animals. So not many came forward," he said. He also mostly dubbed for Telugu comic actor Brahmanandam in Hindi.

Dubbing roles

Live action television series

Animated series

Live action films

Hollywood films

South Indian films

Animated films

See also
Dubbing (filmmaking)
List of Indian dubbing artists

References

External links
 

1967 births
Living people
Indian male voice actors
Male actors from Mumbai
Male actors in Hindi cinema
20th-century Indian male actors
21st-century Indian male actors